Clive James Brooks (born 1 February 1992), also known as Yungen, is a British rapper, singer and songwriter from Herne Hill, South London.  Yungen gained initial recognition for his 2011 F64 freestyle video for SB.TV, and by 2015 had been nominated for Best Newcomer at the MOBO Awards. As a grime artist, Yungen takes inspiration from numerous music genres, which varies from rap to R&B and his own experimentations. Yungen's most successful song is "Bestie", which features Yxng Bane, and this song reached top 10 in the UK Singles Chart in October 2017 and also became his first platinum single in February 2018.

Early life
Clive James Brooks was born on 1 February 1992 and was raised in Herne Hill Estate. Although his lyrics expose the darker side of his childhood, he often expresses gratitude in regards to his upbringing. In an interview with the Evening Standard, Yungen stated that, "Growing up on an estate was everything to me." Brooks’ friends on the estate nicknamed him ‘Yungen’, which later gave him the inspiration for his stage name. From the age of 13 Brooks was inspired by an older cousin to try MC’ing, but his shyness prevented him from seeing it as a potential career. Growing up, Brooks listened to a diverse range of genres, enabling him to draw on a variety of influences in his songs. Combining his father's background as Hip hop DJ, meant there was a diverse range of music genres inside his house. In 2008, at the age of 16, the death of his friend  caused Brooks to change his behaviours and become more mature and responsible, thus, he decided to pursue music as a career. Artists such Wretch 32 and Giggs also inspired Yungen to pursue a music career as he could relate to and connect with these artists. Yungen is also an avid supporter of Liverpool F.C.

Career

2009–2014
In 2010, Yungen released his first video on YouTube named 'Hometown'. However, due to its popularity, the video was taken down by the organization. In 2011, the video was re-uploaded on Yungen's original Youtube channel named Yungen TV. The video received interest from SB.TV, founder Jamal Edwards, which led to Yungen's F64 Freestyle video on the channel in 2011. Yungen has since stated that his shyness as a child prevented him from showcasing his music sooner; before making his first music video he had previously avoided all cameras.

Yungen joined Play Dirty in 2012, and released his mixtape Topic of Discussion in April 2013. He then went on to support Naughty Boy throughout his 2014 worldwide tour, performing across Europe, as well as in the UAE and Australia. At the same time, Yungen established his clothing line, Forever Yung. He later independently launched a two part project named ‘Project Black and Red’ in 2014, which featured artists Stormzy, Wretch 32, and Krept and Konan.

Yungen promoted the project with a sold-out gig at the O2 Academy Islington in November 2014, which included guest appearances from many of the artists featured in the album. He released "Don't Take It Personal" on his SoundCloud that same year, a song that explored the darker aspects of his upbringing, including the death of his friend in 2008.

In August 2014, Yungen released "Ain't on Nuttin" with rapper Sneakbo. The two remixes (Part 1 and Part 2) featured rappers such as Section Boyz, Bashy, Stormzy and Ghetts.

2015–present
After the release of Project Black and Red, Yungen was nominated for the 2015 MOBO Best Newcomer Award and signed his first record contract with Sony RCA that November. BBC Radio 1Xtra named Yungen as one of the hottest new artists to watch for 2016, and in February 2016 Yungen released his single "Comfy". In April 2016 Yungen released his next single "Off the Record 2" and performed a sold-out show at Village Underground. This was shortly followed by the release of R&B-inspired "Take My Number" featuring Angel on 10 May 2016. "Take My Number" was followed by "Do It Right", a collaboration with Sneakbo featuring Haile, on 6 December. Independently from Sony, Yungen released the single "You Don't Know Me Like That" through Forever Yung on 5 February 2016, and "Cuffing Season" under House of Forever on 24 November 2016.

In 2016, Yungen also gained greater publicity over a verbal disagreement with the rapper Chip (formerly known as Chipmunk). The argument began when Chip commented on Yungen's MOBO Award nomination, which escalated when each artist wrote and released tracks about the other. When the dispute was resolved, this exposure ultimately helped Yungen improve his rapping credibility and reach a wider audience. Yungen became the face of the Converse Chuck Taylor All Star x Nike Flyknit in 2017, headlining the launch event at the Victoria House, London in April. Also in April, Yungen performed another sold out show, this time at KOKO with Yxng Bane as the support artist. Yungen's first single of 2017, "Bestie" featuring Yxng Bane, was released in June and climbed the UK Charts, reaching the top 10 in October and achieving first Gold status in November 2017 and then Platinum in February 2018. The song's music video was filmed spontaneously in Dubai where the rapper was on a holiday, and during this trip, Yungen asked Yxng Bane to fly out and film it. Later that year, in May, Yungen independently released "Fools Gold" through House of Forever, which was inspired by his dismay that people were living their lives for Instagram.

Yungen performed at a number of festivals in the summer of 2017, including his headline set on the second stage at Wireless Festival on Saturday 8 July, where Skepta performed on the main stage immediately after. Yungen then went on to play Jamaica House at the Indigo at the O2 on 10 August, and V Festival on 20 August. In September 2017, Yungen announced that his The Chosen Tour would commence on 16 November 2017 in Glasgow and end on 1 December at the Dublin Academy. He followed the announcement with two giveaway tracks—"Chosen" on Friday 13 October and "All Night" featuring Mr Eazi on Friday 27 October. Tickets for the Chosen Tour, including those for Shepherd's Bush Empire, sold out. In November 2017, Yungen featured on Steel Banglez's, "Bad", alongside MoStack, Mr. Eazi and Not3s, and this song reached number 30 on the UK Singles Chart.

In 2018, Yungen teamed up with Clean Bandit and Julia Michaels to release a remix of "I Miss You" on 5 January.

Discography

Albums
 Project Black & Red (2014)
 Project Purple (2019)
 Passionate & Paranoid (2022)

Mixtapes
 Topic of Discussion'' (2013)

Singles

As lead artist

As featured artist

Awards and nominations

References 

Living people
Black British male rappers
Rappers from London
People from Herne Hill
1992 births
English people of Jamaican descent